The 1959 Sugar Bowl featured the top-ranked LSU Tigers and the 12th-ranked Clemson Tigers. LSU had already secured the national title, as the final editions of both major polls were released a month earlier in early December. With  winner  at halfback, LSU was favored to win by fifteen 

The game's only score came in the late in third quarter, when Cannon threw a 9-yard touchdown pass to Mickey Mangham for a  lead. LSU had recovered a poor snap from punt formation deep in Clemson territory to set up the score. LSU quarterback  broke his hand on the third play of the game, but it was not discovered until late in the 

LSU's defense shut out Clemson and Cannon was named 

LSU's shutout victory over #12 Clemson was convincing and highlighted LSU as the only team in the country to go undefeated. Army, Auburn, and Air Force did not lose all season but they each had one game that ended in a tie. LSU's total first place votes was 130 to win the 1958 National Championship in the AP poll. LSU received 29 of the 35 first-place votes to win the #1 ranking in the Coaches poll. LSU earned the #1 rankings in the AP and Coaches poll during week 6 and held on to the #1 rankings for the rest of the year to win the 1958 National Championship in both major polls.

References

Sugar Bowl
Sugar Bowl
Clemson Tigers football bowl games
LSU Tigers football bowl games
Sugar Bowl
Sugar Bowl